Bankshead is a hamlet in Shropshire, England, near Bishop's Castle and the England-Wales border.

External links

Hamlets in Shropshire
Bishop's Castle